The 2011 Silverstone Superbike World Championship round was the ninth round of the 2011 Superbike World Championship. It took place on the weekend of July 29–31, 2011 at Silverstone Circuit, United Kingdom.

Results

Superbike race 1 classification

Superbike race 2 classification

Supersport race classification

Silverstone Round
Silverstone Superbike World Championship round